Aygyrbatkan (Ayğırbatqan) is a rural locality (a khutor) in Askarovsky Selsoviet, Abzelilovsky District, Bashkortostan, Russia. The population was 30 as of 2010. There are 2 streets.

Geography 
Aygyrbatkan is located 7 km south of Askarovo (the district's administrative centre) by road. Askarovo is the nearest rural locality.

References 

Rural localities in Abzelilovsky District